Higravtindan or Higravstindan is the tallest mountain on the island of Austvågøya in the Lofoten archipelago in Nordland county, Norway. It is located on the border of Hadsel Municipality and Vågan Municipality. There is a glacier located on the east side of the mountain.

References

Vågan
Hadsel
Lofoten
Mountains of Nordland